The Fed Cup Americas Zone Group I is the first stage of the Zonal Groups from the Americas to determine who will advance to the World Group Play-offs, and who will be relegated to the World Group II Play-offs.

Participating teams

Pools

Pool A

Paraguay vs. Colombia

Paraguay vs. Chile

Chile vs. Colombia

Pool B

Brazil vs. Venezuela

Argentina vs. Guatemala

Brazil vs. Guatemala

Argentina vs. Venezuela

Argentina vs. Brazil

Guatemala vs. Venezuela

References 

Americas Zone Group I

2018 Fed Cup Americas Zone